Nkwerre is one of the Local Government Areas in Imo State, South-East, Nigeria. It is situated in Nkwerre town where the name of the local government area was derived. Its population was placed at 80,270 from the 2006 population census with an area of 38.447 km. It is known for its thick vegetation which is supposed to prevent soil erosion however, it is erosion prone area.

The postal code of the local government area is 471. In 2015, Hezekiah University was built in Nkwerre, Ishiala umudi. Nkwerre community that gave the local government area its name was known for its indigenous technology of blacksmithing ingenuity. This endeared the community the name, "Nkwerre Opia Egbe" meaning "Nkwerre, the manufacturer of gun."

History

Notable places in Nkwerre Local Government Area 

 Hezekiah University, Ishiala Umudi. 
 Harmony Aguoru Foundation.

References

[Hezekiah University]

Local Government Areas in Imo State
Towns in Imo State
Local Government Areas in Igboland